The Socialist Revolutionaries (SR) is a political party in Lesotho founded in October 2017 by Teboho Mojapela, a former member of the ABC. The party was registered on 28 January 2018.

in 2019 the party organized farmer protests against Prime Minister Tom Thabane.

In the 2022 general election, the party won 2 seats in the National Assembly.

Election Results

References 

Political parties established in 2017
Political parties in Lesotho
2017 establishments in Africa